Phil Rees Sr. (1914-1986) was an English greyhound trainer. He was three times British champion trainer and a winner of the English Greyhound Derby.

Early life
He worked as a Fleet Street rep, an advertising rep and a greengrocer before training greyhounds on the Welsh flapping tracks (independent tracks). He then became a kennel hand for Ernie Pratt, at Slough Stadium.

Career
After taking out a private trainers licence his first major success came in 1961, when a greyhound called Long Story won the Gold Collar. Just one month later the Derby final favourite Oregon Prince finished runner-up in the 1961 English Greyhound Derby. The greyhound made amends by then winning the Welsh Greyhound Derby.

In 1963 he won the Oaks for the first time with Cranog Bet and the bitch repeated the feat the following year before Rees joined Wimbledon Stadium from Clapton Stadium as a contracted trainer.

Shady Parachute qualified for the 1967 English Greyhound Derby final finishing fourth and one year later Rees had a second and fourth place finish in the final. Shady Parachute was an overwhelming favourite but failed to secure the title, but did win the 1968 Oaks.
 
After a few quieter years Rees finally won the sports biggest prize when Mutts Silver won the 1976 English Greyhound Derby.

In 1978, he retired and transferred the Burhill kennels in Walton-on-Thames to his son Philip Rees Jr. His grandson Richard Rees became a third generation trainer at the Burhill Kennels in 2008.

Awards
He was a three times winner of the Greyhound Trainer of the Year in 1968, 1969 and 1976.

References 

British greyhound racing trainers
1914 births
1986 deaths